Du Yu (born 19 October 1986 in Henan) is a Chinese trap shooter. He competed in the trap event at the 2012 Summer Olympics and placed 30th in the qualification round.

References

External links
 

1986 births
Living people
Chinese male sport shooters
Olympic shooters of China
Shooters at the 2012 Summer Olympics
Sportspeople from Henan
Asian Games medalists in shooting
Shooters at the 2014 Asian Games
Shooters at the 2018 Asian Games
Universiade medalists in shooting
Asian Games gold medalists for China
Asian Games bronze medalists for China
Medalists at the 2014 Asian Games
Medalists at the 2018 Asian Games
Sport shooters from Henan
Universiade silver medalists for China
Medalists at the 2011 Summer Universiade
21st-century Chinese people